Frans is a commune in the Ain department in eastern France.

Population
The inhabitants of Frans are called Franvernois

See also
Communes of the Ain department

References

Communes of Ain
Ain communes articles needing translation from French Wikipedia